CJG may refer to:

 Charles Jasper Glidden (1857–1927), American telephone pioneer
 CJG (airline), a defunct airline of the People's Republic of China